Lakshmipur-1 is a constituency represented in the Jatiya Sangsad (National Parliament) of Bangladesh since 2019 by Anwar Hossain Khan of the Awami League.

Boundaries 
The constituency encompasses Ramganj Upazila.

History 
The constituency was created in 1984 from a Noakhali constituency when the former Noakhali District was split into three districts: Feni, Noakhali, and Lakshmipur.

Members of Parliament

Elections

Elections in the 2010s

Elections in the 2000s

Elections in the 1990s

References

External links
 

Parliamentary constituencies in Bangladesh
Lakshmipur District